Live by the Sea is a live video recording by the English rock band Oasis, released on DVD, VCD, and VHS. It features Oasis' gig at the Southend Cliffs Pavilion on 17 April 1995, as well as the videos for "Rock 'n' Roll Star" and "Cigarettes & Alcohol". The title is a pun on a line from the song "(It's Good) To Be Free".

History and release
The seventeen-track recording was filmed on 17 April 1995 and then released onto VHS on 28 August 1995 and VCD in 1996. Following Big Brother Recordings' purchase of the Oasis catalogue, the album was re-released in 2001 on DVD. The front cover displays the familiar Oasis logo with a blue background instead of a black one, the same logo used on the "Live Forever" single.

Track listing
All songs by Noel Gallagher, except "I Am the Walrus", by Lennon–McCartney.

 "Rock 'n' Roll Star"
 "Columbia"
 "Digsy's Dinner"
 "Some Might Say"
 "Live Forever"
 "Up in the Sky"
 "Acquiesce"
 "Headshrinker"
 "(It's Good) To Be Free"
 "Cigarettes & Alcohol"
 "Married with Children"
 "Sad Song" *
 "D'Yer Wanna Be a Spaceman?" * (abandoned halfway through due to Noel making a mistake)
 "Talk Tonight" *
 "Slide Away"
 "Supersonic"
 "I Am the Walrus"

Bonus music videos on 2001 DVD
 "Rock 'n' Roll Star"
 "Cigarettes & Alcohol"

* Noel Gallagher's solo acoustic set

Personnel
Liam Gallagher – vocals, tambourine
Noel Gallagher – lead guitar, vocals
Paul "Bonehead" Arthurs – rhythm guitar
Paul "Guigsy" McGuigan – bass guitar
Tony McCarroll – drums

Certifications

|-

References

External links 

 Oasis website
 
 Live by the Sea at Discogs

Oasis (band) video albums
Music in Southend-on-Sea